James Edwin Cassidy  (August 1, 1869 – May 17, 1951) was an American prelate of the Roman Catholic Church. He served as bishop of the Diocese of Fall River in Massachusetts from 1934 until his death in 1951.

Biography

Early life 
James Cassidy was born on August 1, 1869, in Woonsocket, Rhode Island, to James and Mary (née Byrne) Cassidy. His father was from County Waterford and his mother from County Armagh in Ireland. James Cassidy attended St. Charles College in Ellicott City, Maryland, and St. Mary's Seminary in Baltimore. He continued his studies at the Pontifical North American College in Rome.

Priesthood 
Cassidy was ordained to the priesthood by Bishop Matthew A. Harkins for the Diocese of Providence on September 8, 1898.

Cassidy served as professor of science at St. Joseph's Seminary in Yonkers, New York, where he also served as treasurer for three years. He then served at a parish in Attleboro, Massachusetts, and later became chancellor of the new Diocese of Fall River. From 1908 to 1913, Cassidy served as rector of St. Mary's Cathedral in Fall River. He was named vicar general of the diocese (1909) and a domestic prelate by the Vatican (1912).  He was appointed pastor of St. Patrick's Parish in Fall River in 1913.

Auxiliary Bishop and Bishop of Fall River 
On March 21, 1930, Cassidy was appointed auxiliary bishop of the Diocese of Fall River and titular bishop of Ibora by Pope Pius XI. He received his episcopal consecration on May 27, 1930, from Archbishop Pietro Biondi, with Bishops Joseph John Rice and George Guertin serving as co-consecrators, at St. Mary's Cathedral. As an auxiliary bishop, he continued to serve as pastor of St. Patrick's and as vicar general. 

Cassidy was named coadjutor bishop of the Diocese of Fall River on July 13, 1934. Upon the death of Bishop Daniel Feehan, Cassidy automatically succeeded him as the third bishop of Fall River on July 28, 1934.

During his 17-year tenure, Cassidy earned a reputation as a strong supporter of the Temperance movement against alcohol consumption and of the rights of workingmen. He also took an active interest in the needs of the elderly, founding several homes for senior citizens. 

In 1934, Cassidy called for the resignation of Will H. Hays as chairman of the Motion Picture Association of America.  He stated that Hays was being "false to the trust imposed on him" and called him "a co-betrayer of with the movie industry of the sacred rights of parents to protection of the morals of their children." In 1942, Cassidy declared that the Women's Army Auxiliary Corps contravened the teachings of the Catholic Church on the role of women, and expressed his hope that no Catholic women would join it. Cassidy was the first American bishop to receive the crimson cross of the Order of Christ from the Portuguese government. In 1945, he received Father James Connolly as his coadjutor bishop.

In January 1951, Cassidy published a pastoral letter forbidding girls cheerleading at Catholic high schools in the diocese, citing the indecency of their outfits.  He also banned football games at night.

Death and legacy 
James Cassidy died on May 17, 1951, at his residence in Fall River at age 81.

Honors
 Grand Officer of the Order of Christ, Portugal (22 September 1939)

References

1869 births
1951 deaths
St. Charles College alumni
St. Mary's Seminary and University alumni
20th-century Roman Catholic bishops in the United States
People from Fall River, Massachusetts
People from Woonsocket, Rhode Island
American people of Irish descent
Roman Catholic bishops of Fall River
Catholics from Rhode Island
Grand Officers of the Order of Christ (Portugal)